Zack Spencer is an American former Negro league pitcher who played in the 1930s.

Spencer made his Negro leagues debut in 1931 with the Chicago Columbia Giants. He went on to play for the Columbus Blue Birds in 1933.

References

External links
 and Seamheads

Year of birth missing
Place of birth missing
Columbia Giants players
Columbus Blue Birds players
Baseball pitchers